Star Awards 2013 (Chinese: 红星大奖 2013) was a double television award ceremony held in Singapore. It is part of the annual Star Awards organised by MediaCorp for the two free-to-air channels, MediaCorp Channel 8 and MediaCorp Channel U. Star Awards 2013 was broadcast live on Channel 8, on 21 April 2013 and 28 April 2013. The first ceremony was held at the MediaCorp TV Theatre while the second ceremony was held at the Marina Bay Sands. The ceremonies were also broadcast on 8 International and the second ceremony on Astro AEC & Astro Quan Jia HD for the first time in HD.
As with the previous three years, viewers were able to catch the presentation of the Professional awards (given out to backstage crew and scriptwriters) on Channel 8. The ceremony was aired live on 21 April, while the annual Star Awards prize presentation (for performance based and popularity awards) was aired on 28 April. A post-show was held after the awards ceremony on 28 April, which was broadcast on Channel U at 2200hrs.

20 programs (eight dramas, nine variety/info-ed, and three current affair programs) won at least one award, the largest representation of programs with one awards tying the last year's ceremony's count. Best Drama Serial Pillow Talk won only one award, its lowest count of awards for a winning Drama Serial, while Unriddle 2 won the most awards for the ceremony with five (two were from the big four major acting categories, and three from Show 1). Joys of Life won three awards out of the largest count of nominations for the ceremony (13), all awarded from Show 1. Only two variety/info-ed programs won multiple awards, which were Find Me A Singaporean 3 and the last year's Star Awards ceremony, the latter retaining the three-year winning streak for Best Variety Special. This was the second ceremony, since 2007 to not present the All-Time Favourite Artiste, in the place was the newly-introduced Honorary TV Award.

Programme details

Notes
Representatives listed are only applicable to the awarded title, and need not be mentioned in the Hall of Fame.
1 A representative will collect the award in place of the nominee.
Unless otherwise stated, the winners are listed first, highlighted in boldface.

Show 1
The first show, titled "亮闪八方" (Shining Light) was broadcast on 21 April 2013 at the MediaCorp Studios at Caldecott Hill.

In place of the usual opener, artistes and nominated backstage personnel were directly ushered to their seats on Show 1, in view of a special tribute for late television icon Huang Wenyong, who died the previous day. A five-minute segment begins with host Lee Teng delivering his eulogy, then 30 seconds of silence was observed, and a video of his contributions was played. The show later opened after a commercial break at 7.08 pm.

Professionally Judged Awards

Awards Eligible for Voting

Rocket Award

Viewership awards

Show 2
The second show was broadcast on 28 April 2013 at the Marina Bay Sands Grand Theatre.

Professionally Judged Awards

Awards Eligible for Voting

Special Award 
The Honorary TV award is introduced as a special achievement award given out posthumously to past artiste(s) to honour contributions made to the local TV industry. The wife and daughter of Huang Wenyong represented the late television icon to receive the Honorary TV Award in recognition of his contributions to Singapore's television industry.

Top 10 awards 
Similar to previous ceremonies, The Top 10 Most Popular Male Artistes and Top 10 Most Popular Female Artistes will be decided by telepoll and online voting; each carrying a 50% weightage towards the final result. The telepoll lines was announced and opened on 15 March 2013, and would run until 28 April at 8.30 pm. The temporary results (Top n) are not publicized on TV but through the Toggle Now app, which users can download from the App Store or Google Play.

The nominees are listed in telepoll line order. The results of the Top 10 awards are not in rank order.

2 Proceeds from the "Top 10 Most Popular Male Artistes" calls for Huang Wenyong will be donated to HCA Hospice.
3 Xiang Yun represented Huang to collect the award.

Post Show Party Awards

Summary of nominations and awards (by programme genre)

Most nominations
Programs that received multiple nominations are listed below, by number of nominations per work:

Most wins

Presenters and performers 
The following individuals presented awards or performed musical numbers.

Show 1

Show 2

Trivia

Absence awards categories
This is the second award ceremony after 2007 the "All Time Favourite Artiste" award was not presented since the category was first presented in 2004. It was thought that Chen Hanwei received his tenth award in 2012 and the award will be given out this year, but it was actually an errata made by the committee. 
In the place was "Honorary TV Award", which was posthumously awarded to Huang Wenyong. As of the most recent ceremony in 2021, it was the only time the award was presented. The award did not return in 2019, although there was a tribute to one artiste, Aloysius Pang, who died earlier on 23 January that year.
The award will return in 2014 after Chen and Bryan Wong received their tenth Top 10 award this year.
The absence for the award will not happen again until 2018, five ceremonies later.

Consecutive nominees and awardees, firsts in Top 10
The nominees for the "Best Current Affairs Presenter" award are the same throughout four consecutive years from 2010 to 2013. Two awardees received the award consecutively twice from 2012, and Chun Guek Lay was being awarded for the consecutive second time. 
A rule revision in 2014 revised the criteria that the award will only be presented if a quota (of 10 nominations minimum) is fulfilled for that particular category; due to this change, three categories will be suspended in the following ceremony, namely "Best Newcomer", "Best News Presenter" and "Best Current Affairs Presenter".
Although the Channel 8 News & Current Affairs had at least ten presenters at the end of 2014, this year was, as of the most recent ceremony in 2021, currently the last time both the "Best News Presenter" and "Best Current Affairs Presenter" had been presented. However, "Best Newcomer" will be presented again in 2015, with the exception for 2016 and 2017.
Rui En was awarded the Most Favourite Female Character award for the third consecutive year. En and Elvin Ng were, for their second consecutive year, awarded the Most Favourite Onscreen Couple award.
Bryan Wong was awarded the Most Favourite Variety Show Host award for the second consecutive year.
This was the first time Belinda Lee and Lee Teng were awarded the Top 10 Most Popular Female and Male Artistes award, respectively.
Dai Xiangyu received his second Top 10 Most Popular Male Artistes award since 2010.
The second season of Unriddle become the sixth drama to receive multiple nominations for the Best Drama Serial.

Star Awards 20 nominations
The 2013 ceremony won all three nominations, which were Best Set Design, Best Variety Research Writer and Best Variety Special, on the following ceremony next year; for the latter it was Star Awards fifth win for the Best Variety Special, and the fourth consecutive time on doing so.

See also 
 List of programmes broadcast by Mediacorp Channel 8
 MediaCorp Channel 8
 MediaCorp Channel U
 Star Awards

References

Star Awards